The Anglo-Franco-Scottish Friendship Cup was a short-lived Inter-League football competition organised by the French Football Federation that would see teams from the Football League and the Scottish League compete against teams from the French League.

Format 
The original idea was to have four teams from Scotland and four teams from England competing together as one nation competing against eight teams from France. Due to the objection by the Scottish League this ruling was cancelled.

Two separate trophies were cast - one for Scottish clubs competing against French clubs and one for English clubs competing against French clubs. Individual clubs could not win the competition, so each country was awarded 2 points for a win and 1 point for a draw.

Entry to the competition was based on a club's final league position at the end of the season. However, with some clubs guaranteed entry to European football competitions such the European Cup and Inter Cities Fairs Cup, it would open up the chance for other clubs to participate who finished lower down their domestic league.

History 
In the inaugural Franco-Scottish competition, Sedan, Toulouse, Lens and Valenciennes were all given entry from the French League to participate in the Franco-Scottish competition. Clyde, Motherwell, Celtic and Dundee were all given entry from the Scottish League. Originally, Ayr United were to have competed, but they had to withdraw because of a lack of adequate floodlighting at their stadium. Their place was taken by Hibernian, who also withdrew because a friendly between an Edinburgh select and Chelsea was scheduled for the same date as their tie with Sedan. Hibernian were therefore replaced by Celtic.

In the inaugural Anglo-French competition, the participating teams were Racing Club de Paris, Nantes, Le Havre and Lille from the French League, and Newcastle United, Liverpool, Bolton Wanderers and Middlesbrough from the Football League.

For the second season of the competition, Le Havre, Rouen, Nimes and Reims were elected to compete on behalf of France in the Franco-Scottish competition, while Bordeaux, Nancy, Lens and Béziers took part in the Anglo-French competition. Three English clubs took part in the 1961-62 competition - Southampton, Blackburn Rovers and Derby County - alongside one Welsh club, Cardiff City. With Celtic and Motherwell set to compete again, Aberdeen and Third Lanark replaced Clyde and Dundee in the Franco-Scottish competition.

Due to disagreements as to when matches should be played, neither of the matches between Celtic and Reims took place.

1960-61

France v Scotland 
Source:

The Valenciennes-Dundee tie played on 7 August 1960 took place at Mers-les-Bains in the Somme department.

Scotland won the inaugural edition of the Franco-Scottish trophy by winning the series, 3 aggregate victories to 1.

France v England 
Source:

England won the inaugural edition of the Anglo-French trophy by winning the series, 4 aggregate victories to 0.

1961-62

France v Scotland 
Source:

France won the last edition of the Franco-Scottish trophy by winning the series, 2 aggregate victories to 1.

France v England 
Source:

The Football League clubs won the second edition of the Anglo-French trophy by winning the series, 2 aggregate victories to 1 (with one match tied).

References

External links 
 Anglo-Franco-British Friendship Cup Scottish Football Historical Archive.
 Anglo-French-Scottish Friendship Cup 1960–62 Scottish League SFAQs.

Defunct football cup competitions in England
International club association football competitions hosted by England
Defunct football competitions in France
International club association football competitions hosted by France
Defunct football cup competitions in Scotland
International club association football competitions hosted by Scotland

1960–61 in English football
1960–61 in French football
1960–61 in Scottish football
1961–62 in English football
1961–62 in French football
1961–62 in Scottish football

1960 establishments in France
1962 disestablishments in France
Recurring sporting events established in 1960
Recurring sporting events disestablished in 1962